BriX is a database containing some protein fragments  from  4 to 14 residue from non-homologous proteins.

There are very few loops registered in Brix, so to address this issue, Loop Brix was added to the system to help structure non-regular elements. These are organized with clustering of end to end elements, and their distance between residues that flank the top of the peptide. Currently, the system also encourages user submitted structures to be uploaded, so long as they match Brix classes.

See also
 Protein structure

References

External links
 http://brix.crg.es

Biological databases
Protein structure
Peptides
Computer-related introductions in 2010